Mick Miller (born 25 February 1950 in Liverpool, England) is an English stand-up comedian who has had a long career on the live comedy circuit, and has a trademark haircut of a bald head with long hair down the sides.

Early days
Miller was born as Michael Lawton on 25 February 1950 in Liverpool, England. Miller's first ambition was to be a footballer. He played as a goalkeeper, and as a boy he signed for Port Vale when Sir Stanley Matthews was the club's general manager and had a trial for the England youth team.

When he left football, he began performing at Pontins, where he became interested in stand-up comedy. After being chief comedian at various Pontins venues, he moved to the North of England and embarked upon a career in the clubs.

Stand-up career
Having won his heat on the talent show New Faces, Miller was then signed to support Chuck Berry on tour.

Since then, he has been a regular at Blackpool, working men's clubs, cruises and after dinner speeches. His shows have been released on DVD, and he has made many TV appearances.

Television appearances
Miller was a regular on the 1970s stand-up show The Comedians, co-presented The Funny Side, regularly appeared on Today With Des and Mel and has been a guest on Blankety Blank, They Think It's All Over and Des O'Connor Tonight.

He acted in Alan Bleasdale's 1978 Play for Today Scully's New Year. In it he played the part of a wannabe stand-up comedian.

In 1993, Miller guested for Chester City in the Granada football Go for Goal quiz show, alongside Arthur Albiston and Joe Hinnigan. Chester City reached the final before losing to Preston North End.

In 2005, he took part in the reality TV show Kings Of Comedy alongside Stan Boardman, Janey Godley, Andrew Maxwell, Boothby Graffoe and David Copperfield.

In 2008 and 2009, he made several appearances on the BBC3 sitcom Ideal, as the father of Johnny Vegas's Moz.

In 2011, he appeared on the ITV show Comedy Rocks with Jason Manford and, in December, he appeared on the Royal Variety Performance.

In 2015, he appeared in the first series of Peter Kay's Car Share playing the character Tony in Episode 6 which was shown on BBC 1.

As of April 2018, Miller was appearing in ITV's Last Laugh in Vegas.

References

External links
Official website

1950 births
Living people
English male comedians
English footballers
Association football goalkeepers
Port Vale F.C. players
English television personalities
Comedians from Liverpool